Orpheus was a legendary figure in Greek mythology, chief among poets and musicians.

Orpheus may also refer to:

Music and dance
 List of Orphean operas, several operas titled Orpheus or variants, including:
 Orpheus (Telemann), a 1726 opera by Georg Philipp Telemann
 Orpheus (Liszt), an 1854 symphonic poem by Franz Liszt
 Orpheus (ballet), a 1948 ballet by Igor Stravinsky and George Balanchine
 Orpheus (band), a 1960s American rock band
 "Orpheus" (Ash song), 2004
 "Orpheus" (David Sylvian song), 1988
 "Orpheus", a song by Sara Bareilles from Amidst the Chaos, 2019
 Orpheus Chamber Orchestra, based in New York City
 Orpheus Foundation, which supports the Orpheus Sinfonia, based in London
 Orpheus Music, an American record label

Film, television, and theater
 Orpheus (play), a 1926 play by Jean Cocteau
 Orpheus (film), a 1950 adaptation of the play, directed by Cocteau
 "Orpheus" (Angel), a 2003 television episode
 "Orpheus" (Stargate SG-1), a 2003 television episode
 Doctor Byron Orpheus, a character in the TV series The Venture Bros.
 Triana Orpheus, a character in the TV series The Venture Bros.
 Orpheus, a character in the 1987 film Saint Seiya: The Movie
 Orpheus, a character in the American soap opera Days of Our Lives

Games and comics
 Orpheus (DC Comics), a fictional character
 Orpheus (role-playing game), published by White Wolf Game Studio
 Orpheus, the main character's persona in the video game Persona 3
 Orpheus, a character from the video game Hades
 Orpheus, a survivor and hunter in the video game Identity V

Places and structures
 Orpheus, Ohio, US
 Orpheus Gate, a geographical pass in Antarctica
 Orpheus Monument, a Roman-era monument in Slovenia

Science and technology
 ORPHEUS, the Organisation for PhD Education in Biomedicine and Health Sciences in the European System
 3361 Orpheus, an Apollo asteroid
 Bristol Siddeley Orpheus, a turbojet engine
 Orpheus, a mockingbird genus, now a junior synonym of Mimus

Ships
 Orpheus (ship), three commercial ships
 HMS Orpheus, several ships of the Royal Navy

Other uses
 Krewe of Orpheus, a New Orleans Mardi Gras krewe
 Orpheus Roye (born 1973), American professional football player
 Orpheus, a character from the Inkheart series by Cornelia Funke

See also
 ORFEUS, the Orbiting Retrievable Far and Extreme Ultraviolet Spectrometer telescope, launched by the Space Shuttle mission 51
 Orpheum (disambiguation), a common name for theaters
 Orphée (disambiguation), the French spelling
 Orfeas (disambiguation), Ορφέας, the Greek spelling
 Orfeo (disambiguation), the Italian spelling
 Orfei, an Italian family name
 Orfeu (disambiguation), the Portuguese spelling
 Orfey (disambiguation), Орфей, the Russian spelling
 Orfeusz i Eurydyka, Polish poetry collection by Czesław Miłosz